Amparoina is a genus of fungi in the family Tricholomataceae. The genus contains two species found in South America.

See also

List of Tricholomataceae genera

References

External links

Tricholomataceae
Agaricales genera
Taxa named by Rolf Singer